Cochylimorpha halophilana is a species of moth of the family Tortricidae. It is found in France, Italy, Hungary, Slovakia, Romania, Russia (Sarepta, the Caucasus), the Near East,  eastern Afghanistan and Iran.

The wingspan is 19–21 mm. Adults have been recorded on wing in July and August.

Larvae have been recorded feeding on Artemisia gallica.

Subspecies
Cochylimorpha halophilana halophilana
Cochylimorpha halophilana adriatica Huemer, 2000 (from Slovakia to south-eastern Europe, from the Caucasus to Iran and Afghanistan)
Cochylimorpha halophilana clavana (Constant, 1888) (France)

References

Moths described in 1872
Cochylimorpha
Moths of Europe
Moths of Asia